The Forum Culiacán is a shopping mall located in Culiacán, Sinaloa, Mexico, in Desarrollo Urbano 3 Ríos (3 Rivers Urban Development), one of the biggest districts in the city, next to Culiacan river. The two story complex includes many clothing stores, a petshop, a food court, and a cinema. It has many shops including New Era.

The mall features the Santa María Tower and Tres Ríos Tower, a Ley Plaza supermarket, the Lucerna Hotel, the Riveras park, the Win Casino, and more around the mall.

Fire
A fire that began in a restaurant's fryer was extinguished by firefighters on September 3, 2017.

Crime
A scene involving motorcyclists took place outside the mall on 6 May 2017.
The Restaurante Mar & Sea, an up-market seafood restaurant formerly known as El Farallón, is owned by former state governor Juan S. Millán. In June 2017, at least eight people at the restaurant were kidnapped by armed men.

References

External links

Shopping malls in Mexico
Shopping malls established in 2003
Culiacán
Buildings and structures in Sinaloa
2003 establishments in Mexico